Lech Wałęsa (born 1943)is a Polish statesman, dissident, and Nobel Peace Prize laureate, who served as the President of Poland between 1990 and 1995.

Wałęsa may also refer to:

 Danuta Wałęsa (born 1949), wife of Lech Wałęsa
 Jarosław Wałęsa (born 1976), Polish MP and son of Lech Wałęsa
 Gdańsk Lech Wałęsa Airport
 Walesa: Man of Hope, a 2013 film about Lech Wałęsa, directed by Andrzej Wajda

Polish-language surnames